The 1954 Copa del Generalísimo was the 52nd staging of the Spanish Cup. The competition began on 2 May 1954 and concluded on 20 June 1954 with the final.

Round of 16

|}
Tiebreaker

|}
Bye: Valencia CF and Real Santander SD.

Quarter-finals

|}
Tiebreaker

|}

Semi-finals

|}

Final

|}

External links
 rsssf.com
 linguasport.com

1954
1953–54 in Spanish football cups